Bernard Piven (September 24, 1929 – February 18, 2002) was an American stage actor, director, and co-founder of the Playwrights Theatre Club, a forerunner of The Second City. He was known as Byrne Piven.

Life and career
Piven was born in Scranton, Pennsylvania the son of Katie (née Balaban) and Samuel Piven, who were Ukrainian-Jewish immigrants. He came to Chicago in 1954 and met Joyce Hiller at the University of Chicago.  They were married a short time later. In the 1950s, the Pivens were two of the founding members of the Playwrights Theatre Club, along with Paul Sills and David Shepard. Playwrights featured such budding stars as Mike Nichols, Elaine May, Ed Asner and Barbara Harris.

In the mid-1950s, the Pivens moved to New York, where they studied with Uta Hagen.  Piven played the leads in several New York Shakespeare Festival productions. He was also part of the Obie Award-winning cast of A House Remembered.

They returned to Chicago in 1967 to rejoin Sills, Sheldon Patinkin, Bernie Sahlins and Joyce Sloane in forming Second City Repertory and then Story Theatre.  Piven, charismatic, balding and bearded, with a beautifully resonant voice, spent some time as an acting teacher at Northwestern University, offering his expertise in improvisation as well as his peculiarly sage view of life, combining a respect for zen and the torah.  In 1972, he and his wife started the Piven Theatre Workshop, partly to supplement their incomes, and partly to have something for their children to do after school, both of whom pursued acting and directing respectively.

Piven was a standby for both Louis Hayward (King Arthur) and Christopher Carey (Mordred) in the national tour of Camelot. The production also featured Arthur Treacher (Pellinore) and Kathryn Grayson (Guenevere) prior to her replacement by Jan Moody.

Some of Piven's favorite roles and productions include: The Man in 605, for which he received the Joseph Jefferson Award for best actor, the Piven Theatre Workshop/Famous Door production of The Shoemakers, directed by Shira Piven, Victory Garden's production of The Value of Names with Shelley Berman, This Old Man Came Rolling Home The Sunshine Boys at the National Jewish Theatre, Bob Falls’ Hamlet (starring Byrne's then-student Aidan Quinn), the role of King Lear in King Lear, and the role of Macbeth in the Workshop's futuristic production of Macbeth, in which he acted alongside his wife, Joyce Piven, who played Lady Macbeth.

Piven also starred as the river boat captain in the Uncle Ben's rice commercials in the 1970s, and many television appearances, including : Miami Vice, 1986, Episode " Free Verse", and Magnum PI, 1987 episode 'On the Fly'. 
He died of lung cancer in Evanston, Illinois.

His son is actor Jeremy Piven. His daughter is film, television, and theatre director Shira Piven.  His brother was the late criminology professor Herman Piven, who was for a time married to Frances Fox Piven.

Filmography

References

External links

 
 
 

1929 births
2002 deaths
Actors from Scranton, Pennsylvania
Jewish American male actors
American male film actors
American male stage actors
American male television actors
Deaths from lung cancer
20th-century American male actors
20th-century American Jews
21st-century American Jews